Fitzstephen is an English language Hiberno-Norman surname. It is patronymic as the prefix Fitz- derives from the Old French filz (Modern French fils de), itself from Latin filius, meaning "son of". Its variants include FitzStephen, Fitz Stephen, Fitz-Stephen; alternate spelling Fitzstephens (common name in 16th century Ireland); and the given name turned surname Stephen. Fitzstephen is rare as a given name.  People with the name Fitzstephen include:

James Lynch fitz Stephen
John Óge Lynch fitz Stephen
Ralph fitzStephen
 Robert FitzStephen (fl. 1150), Welsh soldier
 Thomas FitzStephen (died 1120), Normandy, illegitimate son of sea captain for William the Conqueror
 William Fitzstephen (died 1191), servant of Thomas a Becket

See also

References 

Patronymic surnames
Surnames from given names